"Den vita duvan" (The White Dove) is an anti-war song written by Lasse Holm and Alf Robertson. It was originally recorded by Mats Rådberg on his 1975 studio album På egen hand. He also scored a Svensktoppen hit with the song, charting for eleven weeks between 4 May-13 July 1975, topping the chart.

The song has also been recorded by Sten & Stanley on the 1987 album Musik, dans & party 2 1987 and by Leif Hagbergs on the album Låtar vi minns 6.

The Mats Rådberg version is one of the titles in the book Tusen svenska klassiker (2009).

See also
 List of anti-war songs

References

1975 songs
Swedish-language songs
Anti-war songs
Songs written by Lasse Holm
Mats Rådberg songs
Sten & Stanley songs
Songs written by Alf Robertson